King's Cross or Kings Cross may refer to:

London
 King's Cross, London, an area of central London, England
 King's Cross (building), the memorial to George IV that gave the area its name
 King's Cross Central, a development of previously semi-derelict land in the King's Cross area
 London King's Cross railway station, a major London railway terminus
 King's Cross St Pancras tube station for London Underground lines
 The location of the King's Cross fire of November 1987
 King's Cross Thameslink railway station, a former railway station connecting with King's Cross station and King's Cross St Pancras tube station
 King's Cross (ward), London borough of Camden

Other uses
 Kings Cross (band), an Australian band
 King's X, an American rock band 
 "King's Cross" (song), a Pet Shop Boys song from their 1987 album Actually
 King's Cross Hospital, a hospital in Dundee, Scotland
 Kings Cross, New South Wales, an area of Sydney, Australia
 Kings Cross railway station, Sydney, an underground railway station in Sydney
 Kingscross, Arran, North Ayrshire, see List of United Kingdom locations: Kib-Kin#Kin
 A type of solitaire card game
 King's Cross station, on the Hogwarts Express railway in Universal Orlando Resort, Florida, U.S.

See also
King Cross, an ecclesiastical parish in Calderdale, England